The Men's Moguls event in freestyle skiing at the 2006 Winter Olympics in Turin, Italy took place on 15 February at Sauze d'Oulx.

Results

Qualification
The qualification round took place on the afternoon of 15 February, with 35 skiers competing. The top 20 advanced to the final.

Final
The final took place on the evening of 15 February, with Dale Begg-Smith, the top qualifier and final starter, just beating Mikko Ronkainen for the gold medal.

References

Men's freestyle skiing at the 2006 Winter Olympics
Men's events at the 2006 Winter Olympics